The West Suffolk Militia was a militia regiment in the United Kingdom from 1759 to 1881, when it was amalgamated into The Suffolk Regiment.

The regiment was organised at Bury St. Edmunds in 1759. It was embodied in 1778, at which time it was ranked the 39th regiment of militia, and remained active for five years. It was regularly re-ranked through its embodiment, becoming the 36th in 1779, 42nd in 1780, 31st in 1781, and 26th in 1782.

It was embodied again in 1793 for the French Revolutionary Wars, ranked as the 19th. With the resumption of hostilities in 1803, it was embodied as the 59th, and disembodied with the peace in 1814.

In 1833, it was ranked as the 10th. It was embodied during the Crimean War, from December 1854 to June 1856.

In 1881, under the Childers Reforms, the regiment was transferred into The Suffolk Regiment as the 3rd Battalion. This was embodied for the South African War in December 1899, and disembodied in mid-1901, with a second spell of service in 1902.

During the Haldane Reforms in 1908 the battalion was transferred to the Special Reserve, and was embodied on mobilisation in 1914 for the First World War. As with all Special Reserve battalions, it served as a regimental depot, and was disembodied following the end of hostilities in 1919, with personnel transferred to the 2nd Battalion. The battalion nominally remained in existence throughout the Second World War, but was never activated, and was finally disbanded in 1953.

Publications

West Suffolk Militia, regiments.org

Infantry regiments of the British Army
History of the British Army
Suffolk
Military units and formations disestablished in 1881